Michel Leblond (10 May 1932 – 17 December 2009) was a French football midfielder who was a member of the French squad at FIFA World Cup 1954 and a main player of great Stade de Reims in the 1950s. He also holds the honour of being the first person to score in a European Champions' Cup Final. He also played for France at the 1952 Summer Olympics.

Honours
 Division 1: 1953, 1955, 1958, 1960
 Coupe de France: 1958
 European Cup: Runner-up 1956, 1960

References

External links
 
 Profile
 Profile

1932 births
2009 deaths
Sportspeople from Reims
French footballers
France international footballers
Association football midfielders
Stade de Reims players
RC Strasbourg Alsace players
Olympic footballers of France
Footballers at the 1952 Summer Olympics
1954 FIFA World Cup players
French football managers
Stade de Reims managers
Footballers from Grand Est